David Bain (born 1972) is a New Zealand man who was acquitted of murder in 2009. 

David Bain may also refer to:

David Bain (Australian footballer) (born 1966) 
David Bain (Scottish footballer) (1900–1966)
David Haward Bain (born 1949), writer
David McLaren Bain (1891–1915), Scottish rugby union player killed in World War I
Roly Bain (1954–2016), English priest and professional clown, born David Roualeyn Findlater Bain